Zlatko is a South Slavic masculine given name. The name is derived from the word zlato meaning gold with hypocoristic suffix -ko common in South Slavic languages.

Zlatko is a given name. Notable people with the name include:

Zlatko Ćosić, experimental filmmaker and video artist
Zlatko Čajkovski (1923–1998), Croatian and Yugoslavian football (soccer) player and coach
Zlatko Đorić (born 1976), Serbian footballer
Zlatko Škorić (born 1941), former Croatian football player
Zlatko Šugman (1932–2008), one of Slovenia's best known theater, television and film actors
Zlatko Arambašić (born 1969), former Australian football (soccer) player
Zlatko Baloković (1895–1965), Croatian violinist
Zlatko Burić (born 1953), Croat-Danish actor
Zlatko Crnković, several people
Zlatko Dalić (born 1966), Croatian football coach and former player
Zlatko Dedič (born 1984), Slovenian football forward
Zlatko Gall (born 1954), Croatian journalist, commentator and rock critic from Split
Zlatko Grgić (1931–1988), Croatian animator who emigrated to Canada in the late 1960s
Zlatko Horvat (born 1984), Croatian handball player
Zlatko Ivanković, Croatian football coach current Head Coach of NK Sloboda Varaždin
Zlatko Janjić (born 1986), Bosnian footballer
Zlatko Jovanović (born 1984), Bosnian professional basketball player
Zlatko Junuzović (born 1987), Austrian footballer of Bosnian descent
Zlatko Komadina (born 1958), Croatian politician, vice-president of the Social Democratic Party of Croatia
Zlatko Kramarić (born 1956), Croatian liberal politician from Osijek
Zlatko Kranjčar (born 1956), Croatian football manager and former striker
Zlatko Krasni (1951–2008), Serbian poet of Czech origin, lived in Belgrade for most of his life
Zlatko Krmpotić (born 1958), Serbian football manager and former defender
Zlatko Lagumdžija (born 1955), Bosniak politician
Zlatko Manojlović (born 1951), Serbian musician
Zlatko Mateša (born 1949), the Prime Minister of Croatia from late 1995 until January 31, 2000
Zlatko Nastevski (born 1957), Macedonian retired football (soccer) player
Zlatko Papec (born 1934), former Croatian footballer
Zlatko Pejaković, Croatian singer
Zlatko Perica (born 1969), guitarist
Zlatko Portner (born 1962), former Yugoslav handball player
Zlatko Prangasevic (born 1987), Serbian-Swedish hiphop artist and music producer known as Meta Four
Zlatko Runje (born 1979), Croatian goalkeeper
Zlatko Saračević (born 1961), Croatian former handball player
Zlatko Sedlar, Croatian slalom canoeist who competed in the mid-1990s
Zlatko Sudac (born 1971), Roman Catholic diocesan priest for the diocese of Krk, Croatia
Zlatko Tanevski (born 1983), Macedonian footballer (defender)
Zlatko Tesanovic (1956–2012), Bosnian-American physics professor
Zlatko Tomčić (born 1945), Croatian politician, former leader of the Croatian Peasant Party
Zlatko Topčić (born 1955), famous multiple award-winning Bosnian writer and screenwriter
Zlatko Tripić (born 1992), Norwegian-Bosnian footballer
Zlatko Vitez (born 1950), Croatian theatre and film actor
Zlatko Vujović (born 1958), former Bosnian footballer who played as a striker
Zlatko Yankov (Bulgarian: Златко Янков) (born 1966), retired Bulgarian football midfielder
Zlatko Zahovič (born 1971), retired Slovenian footballer, who played as an attacking midfielder
Zlatko Zebić (born 1979), Serbian football player
Zlatko Vukusic Automotive designer (probably) and founder of the car company Zlatko (Car Brand)

Slavic masculine given names
Bosnian masculine given names
Bulgarian masculine given names
Croatian masculine given names
Slovene masculine given names
Serbian masculine given names

sv:Zlatko